Jérôme Blanchard (born 20 July 1981) is a French former pair skater. With Sabrina Lefrançois, he is the 2004 French national champion. He also competed for one season with Maria Mukhortova.

Career 
With partner Sabrina Lefrançois, he won the gold medal at the 2004 French Figure Skating Championships. She retired due to injury. He later trained with Rinata Araslanova. In mid-2007, he began skating with Valeria Vorobieva. The French skating federation was reluctant to release Blanchard but after a long battle he was free to skate with Vorobieva for Russia. However, they did not compete in any international events and their partnership dissolved. 

Blanchard then skated in Russian ice shows. He was partnered with singer Yulia Savicheva for the Star Ice show. In May 2010, Blanchard teamed up with Maria Mukhortova to compete for Russia. At the 2011 Russian Nationals, they finished 7th overall. In February 2011, their coach Oleg Vasiliev said they had taken some time off due to funding issues. On March 4, Vasiliev confirmed their partnership had ended and Blanchard had returned to France to work at the family hotel.

At fall 2015, Blanchard started coaching single skating at Figure Skating Amsterdam, the Netherlands. His students include:
 Sam Jansen (National Champion Advanced Novice)
 Linden van Bemmel
 Kyarha van Tiel (till 2017)
 Kylie Loots (National Champion Advanced Novice)
 Tyler ter Meulen (former artistic rollerskating European Youth champion)

Programs

With Mukhortova

With Lefrançois

Competitive highlights

With Mukhortova

With Lefrançois

References

External links
 
 

1981 births
French male pair skaters
Living people
Sportspeople from Lyon